The "Pelobacteraceae" are a bacterial family in the order Desulfuromonadales. The species are anaerobic and have a fermentative metabolism.

References

External links
LPSN: Pelobacter